Gu Juan (born 26 May 1990) is a Chinese-born Singaporean badminton player who competed at the 2012 Summer Olympics.

Early life 
Gu followed her father to Nanjing when she was six years old. Due to poor body constitution, her father sent her to a badminton school to build her up. Gu represented Nanjing and won a competition. She was subsequently invited to join the Beijing badminton team but withdrew after not being used to the weather conditions. Gu then further represented Nanjing in the Jiangsu sports competition and won the girls doubles and mixed doubles. Former Jiangsu badminton coach, representing the Singapore Badminton Association, scouted her and invited her to Singapore.

Gu came to Singapore in 2003 under the Foreign Sports Talent Scheme and became a Singapore citizen in June 2007. She left the Singapore national team to return to Shanghai for studies a year later. However, 16 months later, after the persuasion of the Singapore national badminton team's head coach, she re-joined the national team.

Career 
Gu was part of the Singapore women's team who won the silver medal at the 2007 Southeast Asian Games held in Thailand. In 2012, Gu was selected as Singapore's only Olympic women's singles player for the 2012 Summer Olympics by the Singapore Badminton Association, ahead of Southeast Asian Games women's singles champion Fu Mingtian.  At the 2012 Olympics, she qualified from her group before losing to Cheng Shao-chieh.

Awards 
Gu received the 2013 Meritorious Award from the Singapore National Olympic Committee.

Achievements

BWF World Junior Championships 
Girls' singles

Asian Junior Championships 
Girls' singles

BWF Grand Prix 
The BWF Grand Prix had two levels, the BWF Grand Prix and Grand Prix Gold. It was a series of badminton tournaments sanctioned by the Badminton World Federation (BWF) which was held from 2007 to 2017.

Women's singles

  BWF Grand Prix Gold tournament
  BWF Grand Prix tournament

BWF International Challenge/Series 
Women's singles

Women's doubles

  BWF International Challenge tournament
  BWF International Series tournament

Record against selected opponents 
Record against year-end Finals finalists, World Championships semi-finalists, and Olympic quarter-finalists

  Victoria Na 1–0
  Petya Nedelcheva 3–3
  Zhu Lin 1–0
  Wang Yihan 0–4
  Wang Xin 0–3
  Wang Shixian 0–4
  Li Xuerui 1–5
  Yao Xue 0–1
  Liu Xin 0–1
  Wang Lin 0–1
  Cheng Shao-chieh 2–3
  Tai Tzu-ying 3–2
  Pi Hongyan 1–2
  Zhou Mi 0–1
  Yip Pui Yin 2–1
  Saina Nehwal 1–5
  Maria Kristin Yulianti 1–0
  Eriko Hirose 1–2
  Sayaka Sato 1–2
  Minatsu Mitani 0–4
  Bae Youn-joo 2–2
  Sung Ji-hyun 0–2
  Wong Mew Choo 1–0
  Monika Fašungová 2–0
  Porntip Buranaprasertsuk 2–5
  Ratchanok Intanon 1–3

References

External links
 

1990 births
Living people
People from Yancheng
Badminton players from Jiangsu
Chinese emigrants to Singapore
Singaporean sportspeople of Chinese descent
Naturalised citizens of Singapore
Chinese female badminton players
Singaporean female badminton players
Badminton players at the 2012 Summer Olympics
Olympic badminton players of Singapore
Competitors at the 2007 Southeast Asian Games
Competitors at the 2011 Southeast Asian Games
Competitors at the 2013 Southeast Asian Games
Southeast Asian Games silver medalists for Singapore
Southeast Asian Games bronze medalists for Singapore
Southeast Asian Games medalists in badminton